Italy sent a delegation of 86 athletes and 6 guides to compete at the 2008 Summer Paralympics in Beijing. Italian competitors took part in 12 sports: athletics, rowing, cycling, judo, swimming, wheelchair fencing, equestrian, wheelchair tennis, shooting, archery, table tennis and sailing.

Medallists

Sports

Archery

Men

|-
|align=left|Alberto Simonelli
|align=left|Men's individual compound standing
|667
|15
|W 112-107
|W 115-112
|W 111-110
|W 116-110
|L 111-116
|
|-
|align=left|Fabio Luca Azzolini
|align=left|Men's individual compound W1
|593
|10
|
|W 107-101
|L 97-113
|colspan=3|did not advance
|-
|align=left|Mario Esposito
|align=left|Men's individual recurve standing
|631
|1
|Bye
|W 101-98
|W 102-95
|L 91-95
|L 93-98
|4
|-
|align=left|Oscar de Pellegrin
|rowspan=3 align=left|Men's individual recurve W1/W2
|629
|4
|W 107-76
|L 99-101
|colspan=4|did not advance
|-
|align=left|Antonino Lisotta
|556
|25
|L 90-97
|colspan=5|did not advance
|-
|align=left|Marco Vitale
|624
|7
|W 104-99
|W 101-97
|W 102-98
|W 103-101
|L 104-108
|
|-
|align=left|Oscar de Pellegrin Mario Esposito Marco Vitale
|align=left|Men's team recurve
|1884
|2
|colspan=2 
|W 206-202
|L 201-208
|W 207-194
|
|}

Women

|-
|align=left|Elisabetta Mijno
|align=left|Women's individual recurve W1/W2
|519
|11
|
|L 94-98
|colspan=4|did not advance
|}

Athletics

Men's track

Men's field

Women's track

Cycling

Men's road

Men's track

Women's road

Women's track

Equestrian

Individual events

Team

Judo

Men

Rowing

Sailing

Shooting

Men

Women

Swimming

Men

Women

Table tennis

Men

Women

Wheelchair fencing

Men

Women

Wheelchair tennis

Men

Women

Quads

See also
Italy at the Paralympics
Italy at the 2008 Summer Olympics

External links
Beijing 2008 Paralympic Games Official Site
International Paralympic Committee

References

Nations at the 2008 Summer Paralympics
2008
Paralympics